Ludwig Bechstein (24 November 1801 – 14 May 1860) was a German writer and collector of folk fairy tales.

He was born in Weimar, the illegitimate child of Johanna Carolina Dorothea Bechstein and Hubert Dupontreau, a French emigrant who disappeared before the birth of the child; Ludwig thus grew up very poor in his first nine years. His situation improved only when his uncle Johann Matthäus Bechstein, a renowned naturalist and forester living in Meiningen in the country of Duchy of Saxe-Meiningen, adopted him in 1810. He was sent to school in Meiningen, and in 1818, started an apprenticeship as a pharmacist.

From 1828 to 1831 he studied philosophy and literature in Leipzig and Munich thanks to a stipend granted by Duke Bernhard II of Sachsen-Meiningen, who hired him subsequently as a librarian. This lifetime post provided Bechstein with a continuous income, while leaving him a lot of freedom to pursue his own interests and writing. He lived from 1831 until his death in Meiningen. In his honor, a fountain was built in the English Garden.

Bechstein published many works and was a successful author of his time. His German Fairy Tale Book was even more popular than the Brothers Grimm's collection when it was first published in 1845. He published several collections of folk tales, and also published romances and poems

Important works

 Thüringische Volksmärchen (1823)
 Sonettenkränze (1826, through which Duke Bernhard became interested in him)
 The Children of Haymon (1830, epic poem)
 Der Totentanz (The Dance of Death, 1831, epic poem)
 Grimmenthal (1833, novel)
 Luther (1834)
 Der Sagenschatz und die Sagenkreise des Thüringerlandes (A treasury of the tales of Thuringian legends and legend cycles)(1835–38)
 Fahrten eines Musikanten (Journeys of a Musician, 1836–37, novel)
 Deutsches Märchenbuch (German Fairy-Tale Book, 1845; 41st ed., 1893); French translation with introduction and comments: Corinne and Claude Lecouteux, Paris, José Corti, 2010 (collection Merveilleux); English (complete) translation: Michael Haldane (see External Links)
 New Natural History of Pet Birds (1846, humorous didactic poem)
 Berthold der Student (1850, novel)
 Deutsches Sagenbuch (1853)Volksmärchen (1823)
 Sonettenkränze (1826, through which Duke Bernhard became interested in him)
 The Children of Haymon (1830, epic poem)
 Der Totentanz (The Dance of Death, 1831, epic poem)
 Grimmenthal (1833, novel)
 Luther (1834)
 Der Sagenschatz und die Sagenkreise des Thüringerlandes (A treasury of the tales of Thuringian legends and legend cycles)(1835–38)
 Fahrten eines Musikanten (Journeys of a Musician, 1836–37, novel)
 '
 Neues Deutsches Märchenbuch (New German Fairy-Tale Book, 1856; 105th ed., 1922); English (complete) translation: Michael Haldane (see External Links)
 Thüringer Sagenbuch (1858)
 Thuringia's Royal House'' (1865)

Schools named after Ludwig Bechstein
 Staatliche Grundschule 6, Erfurt: Bechsteinschule (public elementary school)
 Ludwig-Bechstein-Grundschule, Meiningen: (public elementary school)

Notes

References

External links

 
 
 
 

1801 births
1860 deaths
Writers from Weimar
People from Saxe-Weimar
Artists from Meiningen
People from Saxe-Meiningen
Leipzig University alumni
Ludwig Maximilian University of Munich alumni
German male writers